Album of the Year may refer to:

Awards
 ARIA Award for Album of the Year, Australia
 Brit Award for British Album of the Year, UK
 Grammy Award for Album of the Year, US
 Juno Award for Album of the Year, CA
 Latin Grammy Award for Album of the Year, US/international
 Lo Nuestro Award for Album of the Year, US/international
 MAMA Award for Album of the Year, South Korea/Asia
 MTV Video Music Award for Album of the Year, US

Albums
 Album of the Year (Art Blakey album), 1981
 Album of the Year (Black Milk album), 2010
 Album of the Year (Faith No More album), 1997
 Album of the Year (The Good Life album) or the title song, 2004
 The Album of the Year, a compilation album from Suave House Records, 1997

Songs
 "Album of the Year (Freestyle)", a song by J. Cole, 2018

See also
Record of the Year (disambiguation)